Old Pekin (also referred to as Pekin and Pekin Station) is an unincorporated community in Polk Township, Washington County, in the U.S. state of Indiana.

The community is the site of Eastern High School.

History
Pekin is known for having the nation's longest running consecutive Fourth of July celebration.

Geography

References

Unincorporated communities in Indiana
Unincorporated communities in Washington County, Indiana
Louisville metropolitan area